The Department of Mines and Petroleum was a department of the Government of Western Australia until it was superseded by the Department of Mines, Industry Regulation and Safety on 1 July 2017. The department was formed on 1 January 2009, out of the former Department of Industry and Resources and Department of Consumer and Employment Protection, which were split into three new departments, the Department of Mines and Petroleum, the Department of State Development and the Department of Commerce.

Its focus is the resources sector, maintaining a mining and petroleum regulatory role and incorporating the resources safety responsibilities from the former Department of Consumer and Employment Protection. It also oversees the Geological Survey of Western Australia.

The department operates the MINEDEX website, a continuously updated database containing information on mines, mineral deposits and prospects in Western Australia.

Earlier history
The original Department of Mines was created on 1 January 1894 and ceased in that name on 1 July 1992 when it became the Department of Minerals and Energy.

During the 1894 - 1992 era, the department was originally divided into branches:
 Registration
 Accounts Correspondence
 Drafting
 Government Geologist (1896 was known as the Geological Survey Branch).

Before the change of 1992, the branches had become divisions:
 Geological Survey
 Mining Engineering
 Petroleum
 Government Chemical Laboratories
 Corporate Services
 Explosives and Dangerous Goods
 Mining Registration
 Surveys & Mapping

2000s 
On 1 July 2001 Department of Minerals and Energy and the Department of Resources Development were merged to form the Department of Mineral and Petroleum Resources.

Further to a review in 2003 the Department was merged with the Department of Industry and Technology to form the Department of Industry and Resources on 3 February 2003.

This department was divided into business groups:
 Mineral and Petroleum Resources
 Business and Trade Services
 Investment Services

The Department was changed again on 1 January 2009 and three new departments were formed:

 Department of Mines and Petroleum
 Department of State Development 
 Department of Commerce (which included the Science and Innovation functions of the Department of Industry and Resources)

See also

Mining in Western Australia
Regions of Western Australia
State Batteries in Western Australia
Western Australia Atlas of mineral deposits and petroleum fields

References

External links
 Government of Western Australia website
 Department of Mines and Petroleum website

Mines
Mining in Western Australia
2009 establishments in Australia
2017 disestablishments in Australia
Government agencies established in 2009
Government agencies disestablished in 2017